Aldo Donati may refer to:
 Aldo Donati (footballer)
 Aldo Donati (singer)